Route 395 is a collector road in the Canadian province of Nova Scotia.

It is located in Inverness County and connects Southwest Margaree at Trunk 19 with Whycocomagh at Highway 105.

Communities
 Southwest Margaree
 Upper Margaree
 East Lake Ainslie
 South Lake Ainslie
 Ainslie Glen
 Churchview

Parks
Southwest Margaree Provincial Park
Trout River Provincial Park

See also
List of Nova Scotia provincial highways

References

Roads in Inverness County, Nova Scotia
Nova Scotia provincial highways